Ryskino is a rural locality (a selo) in Kazenno-Maydansky Selsoviet of Kovylkinsky District in the Republic of Mordovia, Russia.

References

Rural localities in Mordovia
Kovylkinsky District